The following outline is provided as an overview of and topical guide to Vietnam:

Vietnam – sovereign country located on the eastern extent of the Indochinese Peninsula in Southeast Asia. It is bordered by China to the north, Laos to the northwest, Cambodia to the southwest, and the South China Sea to the east. With a population of over 98 million, Vietnam is the 15th most populous country in the world.

Vietnam was under Chinese control for a thousand years before becoming a nation-state in the 10th century.  Successive dynasties flourished along with geographic and political expansion deeper into Southeast Asia, until it was colonized by the French in the mid-19th century.  Efforts to resist the French eventually led to their expulsion from the country in the mid-20th century, leaving a nation divided politically into two countries.  Bitter fighting between the two sides continued during the Vietnam War, ending with a communist victory in 1975.

Emerging from a long and bitter war, the war-ravaged nation was politically isolated.  The government's centrally planned economic decisions hindered post-war reconstruction and its treatment of the losing side engendered more resentment than reconciliation.  In 1986, it instituted economic and political reforms and began a path towards international reintegration.  By 2000, it had established diplomatic relations with most nations.  Its economic growth had been among the highest in the world in the past decade.  These efforts culminated in Vietnam joining the World Trade Organization in 2007 and its successful bid to become a non-permanent member of the United Nations Security Council in 2008.

General reference 

 Pronunciation:
 Common English country name: Vietnam or Viet Nam
 Official English country name: Socialist Republic of Vietnam
 Common endonym: Việt Nam
 Official endonym: Cộng hòa Xã hội Chủ nghĩa Việt Nam
 Adjectival:  Vietnam, Vietnamese
 Demonym:  Vietnamese
 Etymology: Name of Vietnam
 International rankings of Vietnam
 ISO country codes:  VN, VNM, 704
 ISO region codes:  See ISO 3166-2:VN
 Internet country code top-level domain:  .vn
 Vietnam Directory

Geography of Vietnam 

Geography of Vietnam
 Vietnam is: a country
 Location:
 Northern Hemisphere and Eastern Hemisphere
 Eurasia
 Asia
 Southeast Asia
 Indochina
 Time zone:  UTC+07
 Extreme points of Vietnam
 High:  Fan Si Pan 
 Low:  South China Sea 0 m
 Land boundaries:  4,639 km
 2,130 km
 1,281 km
 1,228 km
 Coastline:  3,444 km (excluding islands)
 Population of Vietnam:98.672.896  - 15th most populous country

 Area of Vietnam: 331,690 km2
 Atlas of Vietnam

Environment of Vietnam 

Environment of Vietnam
 Climate of Vietnam
 Environmental issues in Vietnam
 Renewable energy in Vietnam
 Geology of Vietnam
 Protected areas of Vietnam
 Biosphere reserves in Vietnam
 National parks of Vietnam
 Wildlife of Vietnam
 Fauna of Vietnam
 Birds of Vietnam
 Mammals of Vietnam

Natural geographic features of Vietnam 
 Islands of Vietnam
 Lakes of Vietnam
 Mountains of Vietnam
 Volcanoes in Vietnam
 Rivers of Vietnam
 List of World Heritage Sites in Vietnam

Regions of Vietnam 

Regions of Vietnam

Ecoregions of Vietnam 

List of ecoregions in Vietnam
 Ecoregions in Vietnam

Administrative divisions of Vietnam 

Administrative divisions of Vietnam
 Regions of Vietnam
 Provinces of Vietnam
 Districts of Vietnam

Regions of Vietnam 

The Vietnamese government often groups the various provinces into eight regions. These regions are not always used, and alternative classifications are possible.
Northwestern (Tây Bắc)
Northeastern (Đông Bắc)
Greater Ha NoiRed River Delta (Hà Nội Kinh-Đồng Bằng Sông Hồng)
North Central Coast (Bắc Trung Bộ)
South Central Coast (Nam Trung Bộ)
Central Highlands (Tây Nguyên)
Southeast (Đông Nam Bộ)
SouthwesternMekong River Delta (Tây Nam Bo Việt Nam-Đồng Bằng Sông Cửu Long)

Provinces of Vietnam 

Provinces of Vietnam
Vietnam is divided into 58 provinces (known in Vietnamese as tỉnh).

Districts of Vietnam 

Districts of Vietnam
The provinces of Vietnam are divided into districts (huyện), provincial cities (thành phố trực thuộc tỉnh), and towns (thị xã).

Demography of Vietnam 

Demographics of Vietnam

Government and politics of Vietnam 

 Form of government: single-party socialist republic
 Capital of Vietnam: Hanoi
 Elections in Vietnam
 Political parties in Vietnam

Branches of the government of Vietnam 

Government of Vietnam

Executive branch of the government of Vietnam 
 Head of state: President of Vietnam, Nguyễn Xuân Phúc
 Head of government: Prime Minister of Vietnam, Phạm Minh Chính
 Cabinet of Vietnam

Legislative branch of the government of Vietnam 
 National Assembly of Vietnam (unicameral)

Judicial branch of the government of Vietnam 

Judiciary of Vietnam
 Supreme People's Court of Vietnam
 District Courts of Vietnam
 Provincial People's Courts of Vietnam
 Military tribunals of Vietnam
 Administrative Court of Vietnam
 Economic Court of Vietnam
 Labor Court of Vietnam

Foreign relations of Vietnam 

Foreign relations of Vietnam
 Diplomatic missions in Vietnam
 Diplomatic missions of Vietnam

International organization membership 
The Socialist Republic of Vietnam is a member of:

Asian Development Bank (ADB)
Asia-Pacific Economic Cooperation (APEC)
Asia-Pacific Telecommunity (APT)
Association of Southeast Asian Nations (ASEAN)
Association of Southeast Asian Nations Regional Forum (ARF)
Architects Regional Council Asia (ARCASIA)
Colombo Plan (CP)
East Asia Summit (EAS)
Food and Agriculture Organization (FAO)
Group of 77 (G77)
International Atomic Energy Agency (IAEA)
International Bank for Reconstruction and Development (IBRD)
International Civil Aviation Organization (ICAO)
International Criminal Police Organization (Interpol)
International Development Association (IDA)
International Federation of Red Cross and Red Crescent Societies (IFRCS)
International Finance Corporation (IFC)
International Fund for Agricultural Development (IFAD)
International Labour Organization (ILO)
International Maritime Organization (IMO)
International Mobile Satellite Organization (IMSO)
International Monetary Fund (IMF)
International Olympic Committee (IOC)
International Organization for Migration (IOM)

International Organization for Standardization (ISO)
International Red Cross and Red Crescent Movement (ICRM)
International Telecommunication Union (ITU)
International Telecommunications Satellite Organization (ITSO)
Inter-Parliamentary Union (IPU)
Multilateral Investment Guarantee Agency (MIGA)
Nonaligned Movement (NAM)
Organisation internationale de la Francophonie (OIF)
Organisation for the Prohibition of Chemical Weapons (OPCW)
United Nations (UN)
United Nations Conference on Trade and Development (UNCTAD)
United Nations Educational, Scientific, and Cultural Organization (UNESCO)
United Nations Industrial Development Organization (UNIDO)
Universal Postal Union (UPU)
World Confederation of Labour (WCL)
World Customs Organization (WCO)
World Federation of Trade Unions (WFTU)
World Health Organization (WHO)
World Intellectual Property Organization (WIPO)
World Meteorological Organization (WMO)
World Tourism Organization (UNWTO)
World Trade Organization (WTO)

Law and order in Vietnam 

Law of Vietnam
 Capital punishment in Vietnam
 Constitution of Vietnam
 Crime in Vietnam
 Human rights in Vietnam
 LGBT rights in Vietnam
 Freedom of religion in Vietnam
 Law enforcement in Vietnam
 Prosecution
 Supreme People's Procuracy of Vietnam

Military of Vietnam 

Military of Vietnam
 Command
 Commander-in-chief:
 Ministry of Defence of Vietnam
 Forces
 People's Army of Vietnam
 Navy of Vietnam
 Air Force of Vietnam
 Special forces of Vietnam
 Military history of Vietnam
 Military ranks of Vietnam

Local government in Vietnam 

Local government in Vietnam

History of Vietnam 

History of Vietnam
 Economic history of Vietnam
 Military history of Vietnam

Culture of Vietnam 

Culture of Vietnam
 Architecture of Vietnam
 Cuisine of Vietnam
 Vietnamese clothing
 Ethnic minorities in Vietnam
 Languages of Vietnam
 Media in Vietnam
 Museums in Vietnam
 National symbols of Vietnam
 Coat of arms of Vietnam
 Flag of Vietnam
 National anthem of Vietnam
 People of Vietnam
 Prostitution in Vietnam
 Public holidays in Vietnam
 List of World Heritage Sites in Vietnam

Art in Vietnam 

 Cinema of Vietnam
 Literature of Vietnam
 Music of Vietnam
 Television in Vietnam
 Theatre in Vietnam

Religion in Vietnam 

Religion in Vietnam
 Buddhism in Vietnam
 Christianity in Vietnam
 Hinduism in Vietnam
 Islam in Vietnam
 Judaism in Vietnam

Sport in Vietnam 

Sport in Vietnam
 Football in Vietnam
 Vietnam at the Olympics

Economy and infrastructure of Vietnam 

Economy of Vietnam
 Economic rank, by nominal GDP (2007): 59th (fifty-ninth)
 Agriculture in Vietnam
 Banking in Vietnam
 State Bank of Vietnam (central bank)
 Communications in Vietnam
 Internet in Vietnam
 Companies of Vietnam
Currency of Vietnam: Dồng
ISO 4217: VND
 Economic history of Vietnam
 Energy in Vietnam
 Five-Year Plans of Vietnam
 Health care in Vietnam
 Tourism in Vietnam
 Transport in Vietnam
 Airports in Vietnam
 Rail transport in Vietnam
 Water supply and sanitation in Vietnam

Education in Vietnam 

Education in Vietnam

Health in Vietnam 

Health in Vietnam

See also 

Vietnam
Index of Vietnam-related articles
List of international rankings
List of Vietnam-related topics
Member state of the United Nations
Outline of Asia
Outline of geography

References

External links 

 Government
 Portal of the Government of Vietnam
 Communist Party of Vietnam
 Ministry of Industry and Trade Website
 National Assembly: the Vietnamese legislative body
 General Statistics Office
 Ministry of Foreign Affairs
 Economy
 Web site providing insights for doing business in Vietnam
 Site Vietnam economy 
 Vietnam Economy 
 National Securities Center
 Securities

 Media

 State-run
 Voice of Vietnam: State radio broadcaster
 Vietnam Television: State television broadcaster
 Vietnam News Agency: Official state news agency
 Nhân Dân (The People): Official Communist Party newspaper
 Quân đội Nhân Dân: Newspaper of the People's Army
 Vietnam Net: Largest Vietnamese portal, run by the government-owned Vietnam Post and Telecommunication Corporation
 Hà Nội Mới (New Hanoi): run by the Hanoi Communist Party 
 Sài Gòn Giải Phóng (Liberated Saigon): run by the Ho Chi Minh City Communist Party

 Non state-run
While all media in Vietnam must be sponsored by a Communist Party organization and be registered with the government, the following media sources have less government control than others.
 VnExpress: Popular online newspaper 
 Tuổi Trẻ (Youth): Daily newspaper with highest circulation, affiliated with the Ho Chi Minh Communist Youth Organization of Ho Chi Minh City 
 Thanh Niên (Youth): Major daily newspaper, affiliated with the Vietnam National Youth Federation
 Lao Động (Labour): Major daily newspaper, affiliated with the Vietnam General Confederation of Labour (the sole labour union in Vietnam) 
 Tiền Phong (Vanguard): Major daily newspaper, affiliated with the Ho Chi Minh Communist Youth organization 
 Vietnam Economic Times – for foreign investors.

 Overviews
 Culture of Vietnam encyclopedia
 BBC – Country profile: Vietnam
 CIA World Factbook – Vietnam
 Freedom House "Countries at the Crossroads" report - Vietnam: information on government accountability, civil liberties, rule of law, and anticorruption efforts
 VietNam Map or a collection of Vietnamese maps
 Encyclopædia Britannica – Vietnam
 
 US State Department – Vietnam includes Background Notes, Country Study and major reports
 US Library of Congress – Country Study: Vietnam
 Information about Vietnam: from the Vietnamese Ministry of Foreign Affair
 M&A Market in Vietnam's Transition Economy: Vuong, Q.H et al., 2010. Journal of Economic Policy and Research, Vol. 5, No. 1, pp. 1–54 (English)
 Le Viêt Nam, aujourd'hui: News concerning Vietnam (English & French)
 Business Anti-Corruption Portal Vietnam Country Profile
 Vietnam tourism website and Vietnam Travel Official Tourism website of Vietnam

Vietnam
 1